Austinornis is a genus of prehistoric birds related to Galliformes. It is known from a fossil partial tarsometatarsus from the Late Cretaceous of Texas.

References

Prehistoric bird genera
Galliformes
Cretaceous birds
Prehistoric birds of North America
Fossil taxa described in 2004